Gregg Foreman (born October 5, 1972) is an American musician and DJ born in Philadelphia. Foreman gained recognition originally as the front man of The Delta 72, a band that created a frenetic and honest style channeling post-punk rock sensibilities with 1960s British Invasion R&B. The live gigs of The Delta 72 have been characterized by Gregg's energetic stage performances and James Brown-like moves.

Foreman who had been DJing since 1995, also established a career as a popular deejay in his hometown, Philadelphia, and still spins in his resident city, Los Angeles. Foreman's sets span a range from soul music to post-punk, girl group sounds and psychedelic.

He joined Cat Power in 2006, now elevated to musical director. He was also in Pink Mountaintops, founded by Stephen McBean from Black Mountain ; psychedelic, post punk band The Meek, and a part-time member of the slow-burning, psyche rock band The Black Ryder.

In 2015, Foreman worked on Re-Licked, a project of James Williamson of The Stooges, including Alison Mosshart from The Kills and Jello Biafra from the Dead Kennedys.

Gregg also hosts The Pharmacy, a radio show focusing on the architects of underground music, interviewing artists like Alan Vega of Suicide, Anton Newcombe of The Brian Jonestown Massacre, Genesis P-Orridge from Psychic TV and a pioneer of no wave, Lydia Lunch.

In 2019, Gregg released a recording with; Suicide (band) frontman Alan Vega. The Ep, also featured mixes by Nick Cave drummer; Jim Sclavunos and Composer; JG Thirlwell, as well as musical contributions from; Yeah Yeah Yeah's guitarist; Nick Zinner and Art Punk band; White Hills.

In 2019, Gregg also joined American Post-Punk band; The Gossip , for a European tour.

In 2020, Gregg began work with artist; Kat Von D on her debut LP; "Love Made Me Do It".

Gregg has also worked with; Lydia Lunch, David J (Bauhaus), Jesse Malin, Lucinda Williams, Martin Rev, Crocodiles (band), Toody Cole of Dead Moon, L.A. Witch, Linda Perry and many more.

Gregg has one sister — Abbe Foreman, a photographer in Philadelphia — and mother, Vicki Foreman, who was a school teacher. He was raised in Valley Forge and went to Conestoga High School.

References

External links

The Underground Echo: Gregg Foreman Interview

Living people
Musicians from Philadelphia
American DJs
1972 births